Te Aitanga-a-Mahaki is one of the three principal Māori iwi  of the Tūranga district; the others being Rongowhakaata and Ngai Tamanuhiri. It is numerically the largest of the three, with 6,258 affiliated members as of 2013.

The rohe (territory) of Te Aitanga-a-Mahaki extends from the Mangatu land blocks to Hangaroa Matawai, Patutahi and Whataupoko near Gisborne. The boundary also includes Tuamotu Island. While majority of members are situated within the traditional tribal boundaries, there is a significant number present in the Wellington, Auckland and Hawke's Bay regions.

Hapū and marae
Te Aitanga-a-Mahaki includes the following hapū:

 Ngā Pōtiki, with Mātāwai marae, Tākitimu marae of Waituhi, and Tapuihikitia marae in Puha
 Ngāi Tamatea, with Taihamiti marae in Whatatutu
 Ngāi Tūketenui, with Parihimanihi marae in Waihirere
 Ngāti Kōhuru, with Parihimanihi marae in Waihirere
 Ngariki, with Māngatu marae and Te Wainui marae in Whatatutu
 Ngāti Mātāwai, with Mātāwai marae
 Ngāti Wahia, with Māngatu marae in Whatatutu, Parihimanihi marae in Waihirere, and Rangitira marae in Te Karaka
 Te Whānau a Iwi, with Tarere marae in Makaraka
 Te Whānau a Kai, with Ngātapa marae, Pākōwhai marae in Pātūtahi, Rongopai marae in Waituhi, and Tākitimu marae in Waituhi
 Te Whānau a Taupara, with Māngatu marae in Whatatutu, Takipu marae in Te Karaka, and Tapuihikitia marae in Puha

Governance

Te Aitanga-a-Māhaki Trust
Te Aitanga ā Māhaki Trust is the mandated iwi organisation under the Māori Fisheries Act, the iwi aquaculture organisation under the Māori Commercial Aquaculture Claims Settlement Act, and the official iwi authority for resource consent consultation under the Resource Management Act. The charitable trust is governed by eleven trustees, representing each of the recognised marae, and is based in Gisborne.

The rohe of the area covers part of the territory of Gisborne District Council, which is both the district and regional council.

Media

Turanga FM
Turanga FM is the radio station of Turanganui-a-kiwa iwi, including Te Aitanga-a-Māhaki, Rongowhakaata and Ngai Tamanuhiri.

Notable people

Witi Ihimaera – writer
Wi Pere – politician
Te Kani te Ua – tribal leader, genealogist, orator
Lisa Carrington – flatwater canoeist
Tara McAllister - Scientist
Elizabeth Kerekere - Politician, Activist

See also
List of Māori iwi

References

External links
Te Aitanga a Mahaki Trust

 
Gisborne District
Iwi and hapū